The International Society for the Systems Sciences (ISSS) is a worldwide organization for systems sciences. The overall purpose of the ISSS is: 
"to promote the development of conceptual frameworks based on general system theory, as well as their implementation in practice. It further seeks to encourage research and facilitate communication between and among scientists and professionals from various disciplines and professions at local, regional, national, and international levels."

Initially conceived in 1954 as the Society for the Advancement of General Systems Theory, and started in 1955/56, the Society for General Systems Research became the first interdisciplinary and international co-operation in the field of systems theory and systems science. In 1988 it was renamed to the International Society for the Systems Sciences.

History 
The society was initiated in 1954 by biologists Ludwig von Bertalanffy and Ralph Gerard, economist Kenneth Boulding, and mathematician Anatol Rapoport at the Stanford Center for Advanced Study in the Behavioral Sciences.  They called a meeting at the American Association for the Advancement of Science meeting in Berkeley in 1954.  At this meeting, attended by seventy people, the society was conceived as the Society for the Advancement of General Systems Theory.  The next year Boulding, Gerard and Rapoport started working with James Grier Miller at the Mental Health Research Institute of the University of Michigan.  There the society got underway as "Society for General Systems Research".

The statement of the mission of the society was formulated with the following four objectives: 
 to investigate the isomorphy of concepts, laws, and models in various fields, and to help in useful transfers from one field to another
 to encourage the development of adequate theoretical models in areas which lack them
 to eliminate the duplication of theoretical efforts in different fields
 to promote the unity of science through improving the communication among specialists.

In the 1960s local chapters were established in Boston, New York, San Francisco, Washington D.C, and Florida.  Annual meetings were held in the winter, and annually a General Systems Yearbook was published.  Periodical articles were published in the society's journal Behavioral Science, and additionally "The Bulletin" offered regional and thematic publications.

In 1971 the Society had 1100 individual and 6 institutional members, and a membership in some societies affiliated with the American Association for the Advancement of Science.  In 1988, the society was renamed the 'International Society for the Systems Sciences' (ISSS). to "reflect its broadening scope".

Activities 
Important activities of the Society are:
 the General Systems Yearbook
 the General Systems Bulletin 
 the Special Integration Groups

A listing of the Special Integration Groups (SIGs) gives an idea of the themes of ongoing development in the Society:

Presidents 
Among the Presidents of ISSS have been foremost scientists from several fields and countries, including some Nobel laureates:

 Roelien Goede, 2022-2023
 George Mobus, 2021-2022
 Delia MacNamara, 2020-2021
 Shankar Sankaran, 2019-2020
 Peter D. Tuddenham, 2018-2019
 David Rousseau, 2017-2018
 Ockie Bosch, 2016-2017
 John Kineman, 2015-2016
 Ray Ison, 2014-2015
 Gerald Midgley, 2013-2014
 Alexander Laszlo, 2012–2013
 David Ing, 2011-2012 
 Jennifer Wilby, 2010-2011  
 Allenna Leonard, 2009-2010
 Timothy F. H. Allen, 2008-2009 
 Gary Metcalf, 2007-2008

 Kyoichi Kijima, 2006-2007
 Debora Hammond, 2005-2006 
 Enrique Herrscher, 2004-2005 
 Kenneth D. Bailey, 2003 
 Alexander Christakis, 2002 
 Michael C. Jackson, 2001 
 Harold G. Nelson, 2000 
 Peter Corning, 1999 
 Béla A. Bánáthy, 1998 
 G. A. Swanson, 1997 
 Yong Pil Rhee, 1996
 Ervin Laszlo, 1995 
 J. Donald R. de Raadt, 1994 
 Harold A. Linstone, 1993 
 Ian I. Mitroff, 1992 

 Howard T. Odum 1991
 Len R. Troncale, 1990 
 C. West Churchman 1989 
 Ilya Prigogine, 1988
 Russell L. Ackoff, 1987 
 Peter Checkland, 1986 
 John A. Dillon, 1985
 Bela H. Banathy, 1984
 Karl Deutsch, 1983
 John N. Warfield, 1982
 George Klir, 1981 
 Robert Rosen, 1980 
 Brian R. Gaines, 1979 
 Richard F. Ericson, 1978
 Geoffrey Vickers,  1977

 Heinz von Foerster, 1976 
 Kjell Samuelson, 1975 
 Gordon Pask, 1974 
 James Grier Miller, 1973
 Margaret Mead, 1972 
 Stafford Beer, 1971 
 Bertram Gross, 1970 
 Lawrence Slobodkin, 1969
 Milton Rubin, 1968
 John Milsum, 1967
 Peter Caws, 1966 
 Anatol Rapoport, 1965 
 W. Ross Ashby 1962-64 
 Charles A. McClelland 1959-61 
 Kenneth E. Boulding, 1957–58

Sir Geoffrey Vickers Memorial Award 
The Sir Geoffrey Vickers Memorial Award is an annual award in memory of Sir Geoffrey Vickers for  outstanding student papers at the pre-doctoral level in the field of the systems sciences. A listing of recipients:

See also 
 General Systems: Yearbook of the Society for General Systems Research
 List of systems sciences organizations
 International Federation for Systems Research (IFSR)
 International Council on Systems Engineering (INCOSE)
 International Society for Complexity, Information and Design (ISCID)
 Mental Health Research Institute (Michigan)

References

External links 
 Homepage of the International Society of Systems Science 
 ISSS introduction on the IFSR website

Organizations established in 1954
Systems science societies